Aaron Johnson may refer to:

Aaron Johnson (musician) (born 1977), American music producer
Aaron Johnson (ice hockey) (born 1983), Canadian ice hockey player 
Aaron Johnson (basketball) (born 1988), American basketball player
Aaron Krister Johnson, American composer, musician and teacher
Aaron Taylor-Johnson (born 1990), English actor, formerly Aaron Johnson
Aaron M. Johnson (born 1991), American jazz saxophonist and bandleader

See also 
 Aaron Johnston, American author, comics writer, and film producer